Hain is a village and a former municipality in the district of Greiz, in Thuringia, Germany. Since 31 December 2013, it is part of the municipality Langenwetzendorf.

References

Former municipalities in Thuringia